True Blue is the third studio album by American singer-songwriter Madonna, released on June 30, 1986, by Sire Records. She co-wrote and produced the entire album with Stephen Bray and Patrick Leonard. True Blue deals with her visions of love, work, dreams as well as disappointments, and was inspired by her then husband Sean Penn, to whom Madonna dedicated the album. Musically, the songs on the album took a different direction from her previous endeavours, incorporating classical music in order to engage an older audience who had been skeptical of her music.

The album features instrumentation from acoustic guitars, drums, synthesizers and Cuban musical instruments. The topic for the songs range from love, freedom, and in the case of "Papa Don't Preach", social issues like teenage pregnancy. After its release, True Blue received critical acclaim, with music critics who complimented the album as the archetype of the late 1980s and early 1990s pop albums. They also praised the fact that Madonna's voice sounded stronger than it did on her previous efforts, while commending Madonna's skills as a singer, songwriter and entertainer.

True Blue was an immediate global success, reaching number one in then record-breaking 28 countries across the world, including Australia, Canada, France, Germany, the United Kingdom and the United States. It spent 34 consecutive weeks at the top of the European Top 100 Albums chart, longer than any other album in history. It became the world's top-selling album of 1986, as well as the best-selling album of the 1980s by a female artist. With estimated sales of over 25 million copies worldwide, True Blue remains one of the best-selling albums of all time. Five singles released from the album—"Live to Tell", "Papa Don't Preach", "True Blue", "Open Your Heart", and "La Isla Bonita"—all reached number one on either the US Billboard Hot 100 or the UK Singles Chart, with "Papa Don't Preach" being the track that topped both.

The album was promoted on Madonna's second concert tour, 1987's Who's That Girl World Tour, which visited cities in North America, Europe and Asia. True Blue is credited as being the album which established Madonna's position as the biggest female artist of the 1980s, rivaling male musicians like Michael Jackson and Prince. The album's singles and their accompanying music videos have sparked debates among scholars and social groups. She became the first female artist to receive the Video Vanguard Award at the 1986 MTV Video Music Awards in recognition of her impact on popular culture. The album also gave her first appearance on the Guinness Book of World Records.

Background and development 
On March 6, 1986, at the Kensington Roof Gardens in London, during a press conference for Shanghai Surprise, Madonna confirmed that she was working on a new album named Live to Tell, which would be later changed to True Blue. She collaborated with Stephen Bray, who had worked on the preceding Like a Virgin, and with The Virgin Tour's musical director Patrick Leonard. "I was down in the basement with these idiot muso friends, working on a tune," Leonard recalled in 1992. "She liked it. And that ended up being one of the tracks on True Blue."

Madonna wrote or co-wrote every song, although her involvement on ones such as "Papa Don't Preach" and "Open Your Heart" was limited to adding lyrics. She was also credited with co-producing every track. The album was recorded from December 1985 to April 1986, during the first year of Madonna's marriage to American actor Sean Penn. She dedicated the album to Penn, "The coolest guy in the universe." By experimenting with her image, adopting a more 'traditional' look, and incorporating classical music in her songs, Madonna tried to appeal to an older audience who had been skeptical of her music. Deemed Madonna's most girlish album yet, True Blue deals with Madonna's view of love, work and dreams as well as disappointments. According to Madonna, the title was from a favorite expression of her then husband Penn and his very pure vision of love. The album was her "unabashed valentine" for Penn. Most of its songs reflect this idea although each was developed separately. The first track, "Papa Don't Preach", was written by Brian Elliot, who described it as "a love song, maybe framed a little bit differently". The song is based on teenage gossip Elliot heard outside his studio, which had a large front window that doubled as a mirror where schoolgirls from the North Hollywood High School in Los Angeles regularly stopped to fix their hair and chat.

"Open Your Heart" was the first cut recorded for the album, as early as December 1985 and ultimately made it to the final released tracklist; it was originally intended for Cyndi Lauper. The third track "White Heat" was dedicated to actor James Cagney and named after the film of the same name from 1949. Two quotes from the original soundtrack were included in the song. The fourth track "Live to Tell" was written by Patrick Leonard for the soundtrack of Paramount's romantic drama film Fire with Fire but, after the company declined it, Leonard showed the song to Madonna. She decided to use it for At Close Range, the new film of her husband Penn. Madonna made a demo of the song; when the film's director, James Foley, heard it, he asked Leonard to write the score for the film, as suggested by Madonna. True Blue was the first album where Madonna included Spanish themes as evident in the song "La Isla Bonita". The song was written for Michael Jackson's Bad album, but he had turned it down. While working with Leonard, Madonna accepted it in Jackson's place and re-wrote the lyrics, earning herself a co-writing credit. Madonna described it as her tribute to the "beauty and mystery of Latin American people". Originally intended as the first single, "Love Makes the World Go Round" – first performed at Live Aid a year earlier, in July 1985 – closes the album. The song recalled the antiwar music of the sixties.

Composition 

Musically True Blue was a different direction for Madonna. Her previous efforts had her singing in a high pitched voice. With this album, Madonna toned it down for a more bubblegum-pop voice. The songs on the album reflect this and a number of instruments were used in the songs to bring out the different moods which the lyrics emphasized. "Papa Don't Preach" features acoustic, electric, and rhythm guitars, keyboards, and string arrangements. A continuous percussion filled structure was used in "Open Your Heart". "White Heat" sampling of the film's quotation was included with speech and gunshots. It is an uptempo dance song with synth bass and double-tracked vocals supported by male voices in the chorus. "I don't write dance music and I don't see it as contributing to the cultural growth of the world," grumbled Pat Leonard in 1992. "At the time we were doing the groove stuff on the True Blue album, it was semi-innovative. There wasn't a precedent that made you gag. God forbid that I might have contributed to the mess we're in now."
On ballads like "Live to Tell" there is background instrumentation from a keyboard, a synthesizer, a funk guitar and a mix of synthesized and real drumming. "Where's the Party" is a standard dance track with arrangements of bass drums, synthesizer, clattering rhythms and a remixed approach to the whole composition. The title track featured instrumentation from a rhythm guitar, a synthesizer, keyboards, and drums for the bassline, with a backing track that employed a chord progression commonly used in doo-wop Cuban drums and Spanish guitar, maracas and harmonicas are used in "La Isla Bonita". "Jimmy Jimmy" has an early sixties pop influence, its lyrics a tribute to film star James Dean.

Lyrically True Blue reflects Madonna's ideas about love. "Where's the Party" tells of a working girl enjoying the dancefloor after work. "Jimmy Jimmy" talks about Madonna's admiration for the neighbourhood bad boy. The Spanish "La Isla Bonita" and "Love Makes the World Go Round" deal with escapism from normal life, with the latter talking about anti-war and anti-poverty and using Latin drums and samba-influenced rhythms. "White Heat" deals with firmness and quotes Clint Eastwood's "Make my day" catchphrase. "Papa Don't Preach"'s lyrics talk about a young woman who tells her father that she is pregnant out of wedlock, but is going to keep her baby.

"Live to Tell" portraits the complexity of deceit and mistrust. The song also is about childhood scars and had an extreme emotional pitch, achieving it in a divine sense. The title track had Madonna talking about romance and 1950s inspired girl group pop. The lyrics of "True Blue" are constructed in a verse-chorus form, with the theme being Madonna's feelings for Sean Penn; she even uses the 1929 archaic love word "dear" in the line "Just think back and remember, dear". Madonna expressed her sexual desires in the lyrics of "Open Your Heart" and described the beauty of a Latin paradise in "La Isla Bonita".

Packaging 

The album cover, shot by photographer Herb Ritts, is one of Madonna's most recognizable pictures. It features a picture of Madonna from the neck up. The main colors in the picture are gray, white and various shades of blue to reinforce the album's title. Madonna positioned herself in an elegant pose while wearing pale make up with red lips, tilting back her neck in a swan like pose. Jeri Heiden, who was working at Warner Bros. art department, was given the task of editing the photos and making them compatible for appearance in an album cover. She had to work with a total of 60 rolls of photos, each of size 35 mm. Heiden ordered about 30 to 40 test prints from Ritts' studio and made recommendations based on it. Several images from the photo shoot were considered for the album cover, some of which later became the single covers for "Papa Don't Preach" and "True Blue". The final photo was selected by Madonna, Heiden and Jeff Ayeroff, creative director of Warner Bros. at that time.

After the final photo was selected, Heiden commissioned two different versions of the album cover. The original image was taken in black-and-white, and Heiden experimented with a variety of treatments of the photo, to go along with the album's title, and finally arrived at the blue toned, hand tinted version of the image. The LP and CD album cover is a cropped image of a longer picture including torso, more of which is seen in the cover of the cassette tape edition, and was also included as a fold-out poster in the initial pressings of the LP.

In the US and Canada, the cover did not have any logo, but in the European nations, they were sold with Madonna's name and album title on the cover. Heiden explained in an interview with Aperture magazine that they thought it would be "cool" to use a shrink wrap on the US covers, so that when one took it off, there would only be the photo of Madonna. For the European nations, Warner felt that the name was needed on the cover, as they did not want to take chance with Madonna's popularity there. The back sleeve and the booklet inside featured the song titles in Heiden's own handwriting. About cropping the image for the cassette and the vinyl versions, Heiden said: "I think the image became more interesting cropped into a square—and at that time we always started with the album cover configuration. It was like she was floating—her clothing was not visible. She took on the appearance of a marble statue—Goddess like. In the vertical cropping you see her leather jacket and the wall, and it becomes more typical, editorial, earthly."

According to Lucy O'Brien, author of Madonna: Like an Icon, the album artwork was on-par with Andy Warhol's concept of pop art. She felt that the image was a mixture of innocence and idealism, while incorporating 1950s-style Technicolor and hand tinted color, characteristic of Warhol's silkscreen printed design, prevalent in the 1960s. Jeri Heiden, the album's cover designer, commented, "She was already highly aware of the value of her image and was in control of it." O'Brien felt that the artwork heralded the arrival of a new Madonna, while drawing on the enduring appeal of her celluloid icon Marilyn Monroe. "With this picture, Madonna made explicit the connection between Warhol and herself, the vivid nexus between pop art and commerce. The late 1980s marked a new era of the pop artist as a brand, and Madonna became the first one to exploit this."

Erica Wexler from Spin described Madonna on the cover as "like a cobra basking in the hot sun, Madonna on the cover of her new album stretches her profile lasciviously." Author J. Randy Taraborrelli commented in Madonna: An Intimate Biography, that the album cover indicated how True Blue was a vehicle of growth for Madonna. He felt that the "washed out color photograph" of her with head tilted back and eyes closed was "understated", especially when compared to the sexier poses she had been associated in the past. The album's inner sleeve did not feature any photographs, and instead was dedicated to album credits and the song lyrics, since Madonna wanted to be represented by her songs on True Blue, not her image. Billboard listed the cover at rank 37 on their article about the "50 Greatest Album Covers", describing it as a striking image of Madonna.

Promotion

Live performance 

Prior to the album's release, Madonna premiered "Love Makes the World Go Round" at the 1985 Live Aid concert. The rest of the album's tracks were included on the setlist of her 1987 Who's That Girl World Tour except "Jimmy Jimmy" which remains still the only song from the album Madonna did not perform on any live appearance. It was her second concert tour and promoted True Blue alongside the film project Who's That Girl. It was Madonna's first world tour, reaching Asia, North America and Europe. Musically and technically superior to her previous Virgin Tour, the Who's That Girl tour incorporated multimedia components to make the show more appealing.

Madonna trained herself physically with aerobics, jogging and weight-lifting, to cope with the choreography and the dance routines. For the costumes, she collaborated with designer Marlene Stewart, expanding on the idea of bringing her popular video characters to life onstage, reworking scenes from "True Blue", "Open Your Heart", "Papa Don't Preach" and "La Isla Bonita". The stage was huge, with four video screens, multimedia projectors and a flight of stairs in the middle. Leonard became the music director and encouraged Madonna to go with the idea of rearranging her older songs and presenting them in a new format. Madonna named the tour 'Who's That Girl', after looking up at a gigantic image of herself projected on a screen on the stage during rehearsals.

The show included song-and-dance routines and theatrics, seven costume changes, and an encore consisting of the title song "Who's That Girl" and "Holiday". The tour also addressed social causes like AIDS, during "Papa Don't Preach". Who's That Girl was critically appreciated, with reviewers commenting on the extravagant nature of the concert and complimenting Madonna for her dancing, costume changes and dynamic pacing. Who's That Girl was a commercial success, grossing a total of U.S. $25 million, with Madonna playing in front of 1.5 million people over the course of the tour. According to Pollstar, it was the second top female concert tour of 1987, behind Tina Turner's Break Every Rule Tour.

Two concerts from the tour were later released on music video, Who's That Girl: Live in Japan (1987), which was exclusive to the Japanese market and Ciao Italia: Live from Italy (1988) which was released internationally. Taraborrelli commented that "Many female artists behave like a diva for a period when they reach superstar status, and the 'Who's That Girl?' tour marked the beginning of Madonna's." The tour is also noted for giving rise to the new Madonna persona, a stronger and more intelligent sexual image of her former self which had given rise to the term Madonna wannabe. A statue of Madonna, wearing a conical bra was erected in her name, at the center of the town of Pacentro in Italy, where her ancestors used to live.

Singles 

"Live to Tell" was the first single released from the album in March 1986. The song was the second ballad for Madonna after "Crazy for You", and was used in the film At Close Range which starred her then husband Sean Penn. The song was received positively by critics with most of them calling it "her best ballad to date" as well as a "tremendous ballad that rewrites the rules of adult contemporary crossover". "Live to Tell" became Madonna's third number one single on the Billboard Hot 100 and her second number-one that is featured in a film after "Crazy for You". It also became a success internationally reaching the top ten in Canada, France, the  Netherlands, Switzerland, and the United Kingdom.

"Papa Don't Preach" was released as the second single in June 1986. It was critically appreciated with most of them declaring it as "the stand-alone song" from the album, also that "with songs like 'Papa Don't Preach', Madonna made the transition from pop tart to consummate artist, joining the ranks of 80s icons like Michael Jackson and Prince." The song became Madonna's fourth number-one single in the U.S. and also reached the top spot in Canada, Ireland, and the United Kingdom.

"True Blue" was released as the album's third single in September 1986. It is a dance-pop song inspired by the Motown's girl groups from the 1960s. Critics generally received the song as a light-hearted, fun track having a 50's feeling to it, although some critics believed that it was "sassless and neutered" as compared to the other songs on the record, and that it was "merely cute and not really up to being the title track of an album". The song became another top ten hit for Madonna reaching number three on the Billboard Hot 100 chart, and peaked at number one in Ireland and the United Kingdom.

"Open Your Heart" was the fourth single from the album released on November 19, 1986. The song was appreciated critically with critics comparing it with sweeter post-Motown valentine songs, and "perfect" for dancefloor strut. The song became Madonna's fifth number-one single on the Billboard Hot 100 chart. Internationally, it became a top ten hit in several European countries including Belgium, Ireland, the Netherlands, and the United Kingdom.

"La Isla Bonita" was released as the fifth and final single in February 1987. The song describes Madonna as a tourist who prays "that the days would last, they went so fast". The first line refers to an island called San Pedro although this has not been clearly stated by Madonna in any interview. The song received positive response with critics calling it one of Madonna's greatest, most influential songs as well as the best song on the album. "La Isla Bonita" was a worldwide hit, reaching number one in Canada, France, Germany, and the United Kingdom, while reaching a peak of four on the Billboard Hot 100 chart.

While not released as a single, "Where's the Party" received airplay on radio stations such as WKSI "Kiss FM", following requests from the public.

Critical reception 

True Blue received critical acclaim. Jon Pareles, in a review for The New York Times, said that True Blue reprised the themes of fidelity in its songs and complimented her addition of a tinge of real world storytelling in her songs, making her reach the "fringes of the permissible". Stephen Holden in another review complimented the album and said that "Madonna goes heavy on heart in this record". In a Rolling Stone review, Davitt Sigerson stated that Madonna was "singing better than ever". The album's songs were described as "catchy", but Sigerson also commented on the lack of "outstanding tracks". He ultimately stated that True Blue is a "sturdy, dependable, lovable new album" which "remains faithful to her past while shamelessly rising above it".

Stephen Thomas Erlewine, in a review for AllMusic, declared it as "one of the great dance-pop albums, a record that demonstrates Madonna's true skills as a songwriter, record-maker, provocateur, and entertainer through its wide reach, accomplishment, and sheer sense of fun." He also felt that Madonna's endeavors in True Blue made it "[brilliant], using the music to hook in critics." Erlewine found that the songs on the album had a poignant mixture of topics, which further solidied its popularity. Sal Cinquemani from Slant Magazine called the album "the supreme archetype for late '80s and early '90s pop music.[...] Time stamped with '80s-era keyboard and drum synths, True Blue, though chockfull of hits, is the most dated of Madonna's albums." He praised the album's songs for being more mature than "Material Girl", and said that the album "includes some of Madonna's greatest, most influential hits (the robust "Open Your Heart" and the timeless "La Isla Bonita"), but it's also home to some of her biggest clunkers." Michael Paoletta from Billboard commented in 2001 that nearly 20 years after its debut, the album is still irresistible.

Entertainment Weekly reviewer Jim Farber said "Though Madonna's third project finds her adding to her palette with Spanish pop ("La Isla Bonita") and messing with our heads with its seeming anti-abortion song ("Papa Don't Preach"). Also notable for 'Live to Tell,' her best ballad to date". Robert Christgau was less impressed, accusing Madonna of pandering to the "lowest common denominator" of young listeners with ambiguous lyrics and over-promotion. Robert Hilburn from Los Angeles Times stated that "True Blue isn't revolutionary music, but it is imaginative, highly energized pop that recognizes the limitations and pleasures of Top 40 fare." Erica Wexler from Spin commented that "True Blue is Madonna's rite of passage between pop adolescence and a harsher adult world. With all her contrivances and the delighted tunes that I can't exorcise from my head, her mystique is still explained by the young beefcake who told me, 'I love to pump iron to Madonna'."

Commercial performance 

In the United States, True Blue debuted at number 29 on the Billboard 200 and reached number one on the issue dated August 16, 1986. It stayed on the top position for five consecutive weeks and on the chart for a total of 82 weeks. The album also reached a peak of number 47 on the Top R&B/Hip-Hop Albums chart. True Blue was certified seven times platinum by the Recording Industry Association of America (RIAA) for shipment of over seven million units, making it Madonna's third best-selling album in the United States, behind Like a Virgin (1984) and The Immaculate Collection (1990). After the advent of the Nielsen SoundScan era in 1991, the album sold a further 404,000 copies. It sold additional 301,000 units at the BMG Music Club, which are not counted by the Nielsen SoundScan. In Canada, the album debuted at number 73 on the RPM albums chart for the issue of July 5, 1986. The album climbed rapidly upwards and reached number one on the issue dated August 9, 1986. It stayed at the top for nine weeks and was present on the chart for 77 weeks. True Blue was certified diamond by the Canadian Recording Industry Association (CRIA) for shipment of one million copies. Madonna became the second female artist to surpass the 1 million mark of an album in Canada.

The album enjoyed success in Latin America, where it peaked at number one in Argentina and was certified four-time platinum by the Cámara Argentina de Productores de Fonogramas y Videogramas (CAPIF) for shipment of over 240,000 copies. The same peak position was attained in Brazil where the album was certified gold by the Associação Brasileira dos Produtores de Discos (ABPD). The album managed to sell 205,000 copies during the first-two weeks, and eventually became in one of the best-selling albums in 1987 with sales of 680,000 units. With over 1 million copies sold, True Blue remains as the best-selling album in Brazil by an international female artist.

True Blue was also a commercial success in Asia and Oceania. In Japan, the album peaked at number one on the Oricon CD chart. At the 1987 Japan Gold Disc Awards held by the Recording Industry Association of Japan (RIAJ), True Blue received "Album of the Year Pop Solo" and "Grand Prix Album of the Year", which was given for the year's best-selling international album, while Madonna was honored the "Artist of the Year" for the year's best-selling international artist. In Hong Kong, True Blue was certified platinum by the International Federation of the Phonographic Industry (IFPI) In Australia, the album topped the Kent Music Report albums chart on the issue date of August 4, 1986, staying there for two weeks. It was certified four times platinum by the Australian Recording Industry Association (ARIA) for shipment of 280,000 copies. It also reached number one in New Zealand albums chart and was certified five times platinum by the Recording Industry Association of New Zealand (RIANZ) for shipment of 75,000 copies.

True Blue achieved its biggest commercial reception in European countries, where it topped the European Top 100 Albums chart for 34 consecutive weeks—a record that has yet to be broken—from issue dated July 19, 1986 to March 7, 1987. As of July 1987, it sold 5.5 million units in the continent. In the United Kingdom, True Blue opened at the top of the UK Albums Chart on July 12, 1986, making it the first album by an American artist to debut at number one in British chart history. It remained at the summit for six weeks and on the chart for a total of 85 weeks. True Blue was the best-selling album of 1986 in the United Kingdom. The British Phonographic Industry (BPI) certified it seven times platinum for shipment of 2.1 million copies and as of June 2019, it has sold over two million copies. True Blue also topped the albums chart in France and was certified diamond by the Syndicat National de l'Édition Phonographique (SNEP) for shipment of one million copies. Actual sales of the album in the country stand at 1,300,000 copies as of 2012. In Germany, the album peaked at number one for eight weeks and was certified two times platinum by the Bundesverband Musikindustrie (BVMI) for shipment of one million copies. Similarly, in Italy the album debuted at number one maintaining that position for 20 weeks, of which 15 were consecutive. True Blue became the best-selling album by an international artist with sales of over 1.5 million copies. Across Europe, True Blue achieved platinum status in Finland, gold in Sweden, Ireland, Greece and Portugal and silver in Denmark. According to biographer Christopher Anderson, where it failed to reach the top of the charts, the album nevertheless went gold.

Impact and legacy 

Stephen Thomas Erlewine noted that "True Blue is the album where Madonna truly became 'Madonna the Superstar'—the endlessly ambitious, fearlessly provocative entertainer that knew how to outrage, spark debates, get good reviews—and make good music while she's at it." Mark Savage from BBC stated that True Blue is the album which cemented Madonna's reputation as the 'First Lady of Pop'. Sal Cinquemani from Slant Magazine said that with the album "Madonna made the transition from pop tart to consummate artist, joining the ranks of '80s icons like Michael Jackson and Prince." Similarly, Robert C. Sickels, the author of 100 Entertainers Who Changed America: An Encyclopedia of Pop Culture Luminaries, wrote that the album "cemented Madonna's place as the most popular female musical star of the 1980s, shining alongside male pop icons like Prince and Michael Jackson." NME dubbed the three as a "holy trinity" of pop music of the decade.

Regarding Madonna's influence on the record industry and younger artists, Debbie Gibson's then manager Doug Breitbart commented: "Madonna has brought back a really strong, melodic component to pop music. She has a very youth-oriented, up, bubbly, fun sound." Slant Magazine listed the album at number 60 on their list of "The 100 Best Albums of the 1980s" and stated that "True Blue was the album on which it became readily apparent that Madonna was more than just a flash-in-the-pan pop star." They added, "It's when she began manipulating her image—and her audience—with a real sense of clarity and purpose and made sure she had quality songs to back up her calculation and world-dominating ambition."

The global success of True Blue marked the first time Madonna entering the Guinness Book of World Records in its 1988 edition, where she was dubbed as the most successful singer for 1986. The album also held the record for number one in the most countries, topping the album charts in a total of 28 countries around the world. True Blue was later included in the 1992 edition of Guinness Book of World Records as the best-selling album by a woman, with copies sold of more than 17 million until October 1990. True Blue was also the world's top-selling album of 1986 and the best-selling album of the 1980s by a female artist. With sales of more than 25 million copies worldwide, True Blue remains one of the best-selling albums of all time. True Blue also helped popularize marketing singles from an album, Paul Grein of Billboard reported: "10 or 20 years ago you would have had two singles from an album at the most. Now we're in an era where Madonna is on her fifth single from the album True Blue and Janet Jackson is on her sixth from the LP Control." The album would subsequently produce five top-five singles, continuing her streak of ten consecutive top-five singles at the time.

True Blue also made social impact through its music videos, as author John E. Semonche observed in his book Censoring Sex that Madonna pushed the envelope of what could be shown on television which resulted in increase of her popularity. The music video for "Open Your Heart" was a subject of analysis among scholars for its concept of the stereo-typical male gaze and voyeurism. She appeared as a stripper in the video, who escapes with a young boy from the strip parlour in the end. MTV had some reservations initially before airing the video, which was later resolved after a meeting with Warner Officials. Feminist writer Susan Bordo reacted negatively to the video, saying that the leering and pathetic men in the cubicles and Madonna's escape with the boy is "cynically and mechanically tacked on [as] a way of claiming trendy status for what is just cheesecake—or, perhaps, pornography". Author Donn Welton pointed out that the usual power relationship between the "voyeuristic male gaze and object" is destabilized by the portrayal of the male patrons of the peep show as leering and pathetic.

Author Douglas Kellner noted that the multiculturalism in her music videos and her culturally transgressive moves "turned out to be highly successful moves that endeared her to large and varied youth audiences." In the fall of 1986, Sire Records held Madonna's "Make My Video" contest that involved MTV viewers to make their own videos for "True Blue". Thousands of viewers submitted their recorded tapes which were mainly made using home-made video equipment and featured themselves or relatives as the actors. MTV publicist Peter Danielson said that many of the submissions featured teenagers imitating Madonna. Her Spanish look in the music video for "La Isla Bonita" became popular and appeared in the fashion trends at that time in the form of boleros and layered skirts accessorizing with rosary beads and crucifix like the video. In recognition of her impact on popular culture through her music videos, Madonna was honored with the Video Vanguard Award at the 1986 MTV Video Music Awards, only four years into her career. She became the first female artist to receive such career achievement from MTV. In 2022, Billboard ranked the cover as the 37th greatest album cover of all time.

Track listing 

Notes
  signifies additional lyrics by

Personnel 
Credits adapted from the album's liner notes.

 Madonna – producer, lead vocals, backing vocals (1, 2, 4-9)
 Stephen Bray – producer (1, 5, 6, 8), keyboards (1, 5, 6, 8), drums (1, 5, 6, 8), drum programming (3, 9)
 Fred Zarr – additional keyboards (1, 6, 8)
 Patrick Leonard – producer (2-5, 7, 9), keyboards (2-5, 7, 9), drum programming (3, 4, 7, 9), drums (5), additional keyboards (8)
 Bruce Gaitsch – electric guitar (1), guitars (3, 4, 7), rhythm guitar (6, 8)
 John Putnam – acoustic guitar (1), electric guitar (1)
 David Williams – rhythm guitar (1), guitars (2), backing vocals (3)
 Paul Jackson Jr. – guitars (3, 9)
 Dann Huff – guitars (5)
 Jonathan Moffett – percussion (1, 8), drums (2, 3, 4), backing vocals (3)
 Paulinho da Costa – percussion (2, 7, 9)
 David Boroff – saxophone (5)
 Billy Meyers – string arrangements (1)
 Siedah Garrett – backing vocals (1, 5, 6, 7, 9)
 Edie Lehmann – backing vocals (1, 5, 6, 7, 9)
 Keithen Carter – backing vocals (3)
 Jackie Jackson – backing vocals (3)
 Richard Marx – backing vocals (3)
 Michael Verdick – engineer, mixing
 Michael Hutchinson – keyboard overdub engineer (8)
 Dan Nebenzal – mix assistant
 Steve Hall – mastering
 Channel Recording Studios (Los Angeles, California) – recording location
 Master Control (Burbank, California) – mixing location
 Future Disc (Hollywood, California) – mastering location
 Jeffrey Kent Ayeroff – art direction
 Jeri McManus – art direction, design
 Herb Ritts – photography
 Weisner-DeMann Entertainment – management

Charts

Weekly charts

All-time charts

Year-end charts

Decade-end charts

Certifications and sales

See also 

 List of best-selling albums
 List of best-selling albums by women
 List of best-selling albums by year (UK)
 List of best-selling albums in Brazil
 List of best-selling albums in Europe
 List of best-selling albums in France
 List of best-selling albums in Italy
 List of best-selling albums in Turkey
 List of diamond-certified albums in Canada
 List of European number-one hits of 1986
 List of number-one albums from the 1980s (New Zealand)
 List of number-one albums in Australia during the 1980s
 List of number-one albums of 1986 (Canada)
 List of number-one albums of 1986 (U.S.)
 List of number-one hits of 1986 (Germany)
 List of UK Albums Chart number ones of the 1980s

Notes

References

Book sources

External links 
 
 
Library + Archives: True Blue at the Rock and Roll Hall of Fame

1986 albums
Albums produced by Patrick Leonard
Albums produced by Stephen Bray
Albums produced by Madonna
Madonna albums
Sire Records albums
Warner Records albums
Juno Award for International Album of the Year albums